Hali Koti (also Romanized as Halī Kotī) is a village in Deraz Kola Rural District, Babol Kenar District, Babol County, Mazandaran Province, Iran. At the 2006 census, its population was 88, in 25 families.

References 

Populated places in Babol County